The Darwin International Guitar Festival is held once every two years at the Charles Darwin University, Darwin, Northern Territory, Australia. The festival attracts many Australian guitarists including Karin Schaupp, Saffire, and Slava Grigoryan. Many international stars, such as John Williams, also attend.

Australian composers such as Richard Charlton, Peter Sculthorpe and Nicholas Routley are also features of the festival.

References

External links 
 Official site

Music festivals in Australia